In biology, a taxon (back-formation from taxonomy; plural taxa) is a group of one or more populations of an organism or organisms seen by taxonomists to form a unit. Although neither is required, a taxon is usually known by a particular name and given a particular ranking, especially if and when it is accepted or becomes established. It is very common, however, for taxonomists to remain at odds over what belongs to a taxon and the criteria used for inclusion. If a taxon is given a formal scientific name, its use is then governed by one of the nomenclature codes specifying which scientific name is correct for a particular grouping.

Initial attempts at classifying and ordering organisms (plants and animals) were set forth in Carl Linnaeus's system in Systema Naturae, 10th edition (1758), as well as an unpublished work by Bernard and Antoine Laurent de Jussieu.  The idea of a unit-based system of biological classification was first made widely available in 1805 in the introduction of Jean-Baptiste Lamarck's Flore françoise, and Augustin Pyramus de Candolle's Principes élémentaires de botanique. Lamarck set out a system for the "natural classification" of plants. Since then, systematists continue to construct accurate classifications encompassing the diversity of life; today, a "good" or "useful" taxon is commonly taken to be one that reflects evolutionary relationships.

Many modern systematists, such as advocates of phylogenetic nomenclature, use cladistic methods that require taxa to be monophyletic (all descendants of some ancestor). Their basic unit, therefore, the clade is equivalent to the taxon, assuming that taxa should reflect evolutionary relationships. Similarly, among those contemporary taxonomists working with the traditional Linnean (binomial) nomenclature, few propose taxa they know to be paraphyletic. An example of a long-established taxon that is not also a clade is the class Reptilia, the reptiles; birds and mammals are the descendants of animals traditionally classed as reptiles, but neither are included in the Reptilia (birds are traditionally placed in the class Aves, and mammals in the class Mammalia).

History 
The term taxon was first used in 1926 by Adolf Meyer-Abich for animal groups, as a back-formation from the word taxonomy; the word taxonomy had been coined a century before from the Greek components τάξις (taxis, meaning arrangement) and -νομία (-nomia meaning method). For plants, it was proposed by Herman Johannes Lam in 1948, and it was adopted at the VII International Botanical Congress, held in 1950.

Definition 
The glossary of the International Code of Zoological Nomenclature (1999) defines a
"taxon, (pl. taxa), n.

A taxonomic unit, whether named or not: i.e. a population, or group of populations of organisms which are usually inferred to be phylogenetically related and which have characters in common which differentiate (q.v.) the unit (e.g. a geographic population, a genus, a family, an order) from other such units. A taxon encompasses all included taxa of lower rank (q.v.) and individual organisms. [...]"

Ranks 

A taxon can be assigned a taxonomic rank, usually (but not necessarily) when it is given a formal name.

"Phylum" applies formally to any biological domain, but traditionally it was always used for animals, whereas "division" was traditionally often used for plants, fungi, etc.

A prefix is used to indicate a ranking of lesser importance. The prefix super- indicates a rank above, the prefix sub- indicates a rank below. In zoology, the prefix infra- indicates a rank below sub-. For instance, among the additional ranks of class are superclass, subclass and infraclass.

Rank is relative, and restricted to a particular systematic schema. For example, liverworts have been grouped, in various systems of classification, as a family, order, class, or division (phylum). The use of a narrow set of ranks is challenged by users of cladistics; for example, the mere 10 ranks traditionally used between animal families (governed by the International Code of Zoological Nomenclature (ICZN)) and animal phyla (usually the highest relevant rank in taxonomic work) often cannot adequately represent the evolutionary history as more about a lineage's phylogeny becomes known.

In addition, the class rank is quite often not an evolutionary but a phenetic or paraphyletic group and as opposed to those ranks governed by the ICZN (family-level, genus-level and species-level taxa), can usually not be made monophyletic by exchanging the taxa contained therein. This has given rise to phylogenetic taxonomy and the ongoing development of the PhyloCode, which has been proposed as a new alternative to replace Linnean classification and govern the application of names to clades.  Many cladists do not see any need to depart from traditional nomenclature as governed by the ICZN, International Code of Nomenclature for algae, fungi, and plants, etc.

See also 

 ABCD Schema
 Alpha taxonomy
 Chresonym
 Cladistics
 Folk taxonomy
 Ichnotaxon
 International Code of Nomenclature for algae, fungi, and plants
 International Code of Zoological Nomenclature (ICZN)
 List of taxa named by anagrams
 Rank (botany)
 Rank (zoology)
 Segregate (taxonomy)
 Virus classification

Notes

References

External links 
 

 
Biological classification
Botanical nomenclature
Zoological nomenclature